Sarah Herring Sorin (January 15, 1861 – April 30, 1914) was Arizona's first woman attorney and the first woman to try a case in front of the United States Supreme Court unassisted by a male attorney. Sorin practiced law with her father William Herring in the firm "Herring & Sorin" initially in Tombstone, Arizona, and later in Tucson. After her father's death, Sorin moved to Globe, Arizona, where she became the attorney for the Old Dominion Copper Company and United Globe Mines. Sarah Sorin is a member of the Arizona Women's Hall of Fame. (See photo of Sarah Herring Sorin in the Arizona Library Archives.) She is also included in Stanford Law School's Women's Legal History Biography Project.

Early life in New York City
Sarah Herring Sorin was born in New York City on January 15, 1861, to Colonel William and Mary Inslee Herring. The Herrings had five children: Sarah, Howard, Bertha, Henrietta, and Mary, from oldest to youngest. Her father, Colonel Herring, had graduated from Columbia Law School and later became Deputy District Attorney in New York City and served in the New York State Legislature.

Sarah finished high school in New York and then went on to obtain her teaching credentials. She taught school in New York City while her brother Howard attended high school. By this time Sarah and Howard were the only members of the family left in New York. Through a series of events, the rest of the family had moved far west to the city of Tombstone in the Arizona Territory.

From New York to Tombstone
In 1878, upon the death of her prospecting uncle Joe Herring, her father ventured to the Arizona Territory to settle the estate and evaluate various mining holdings. In the process, Colonel Herring caught the mining fever and decided to work the claims located in Bisbee through his newly formed Neptune Mining Company that was funded by East Coast money. In 1880 the family moved out west to Bisbee Canyon to join Colonel Herring, except for the two oldest, Sarah and Howard. Colonel Herring eventually ceased his mining aspirations and established himself as an attorney for mining companies.

When Sarah and Howard moved west in 1882, the Herring family was now residing in Tombstone. The city was still reeling from the October 1881 Earp-Clanton shoot-out at the O.K. Corral. Colonel Herring was Wyatt Earp's attorney during the murder trial in which Earp was ultimately acquitted. Due to the volatile and polarized atmosphere surrounding the trial, Sarah's father was armed at all times, even in the courtroom, and was often under the protection of hired gunmen.

Not long after her move west, Sarah became the first woman schoolteacher in Tombstone. In her ten years at the school, she also had stints as school librarian and principal. Her favorite activities were riding horseback and playing music.

She also enjoyed the parlor games played in the respectable side of town. Sarah found Tombstone a rapidly growing and civilized city, in spite of the feuds and fights of the rough side of town. Tombstone had surpassed 10,000 in population and had more attorneys than any other city in the Arizona Territory. It also had some of the best restaurants between New Orleans and San Francisco. Sarah and her sisters felt perfectly safe strolling down the sidewalk, even at night. They avoided the part of town that housed the saloons and the infamous Birdcage Theater, where Doc Holliday, Virgil Earp, Wyatt Earp, and Morgan Earp could be found.

Sarah's sister Bertha assisted their father in his law office on Toughnut Street, where most of the law offices were located. Her brother Howard joined his father's law firm as an attorney after being admitted to the bar in 1885.

In 1886 the tide turned on Tombstone. The water levels in the mines began to rise, ruining its potential for mining. The mining companies began focusing on mines in other areas and the population in Tombstone started its downward spiral.  The Herrings did not move. Sarah enjoyed her teaching and her father's law firm thrived. Colonel Herring served the Territory as Arizona Attorney General (1892–93), delegate to the 1891 Constitutional Convention, and President of the Territorial Bar.

On November 2, 1891, Howard died during a dental procedure at the age of 27. Howard had been the heir apparent to Colonel Herring and his law firm. Sarah decided to become an attorney and take Howard's place in the law firm.

Legal training
In 1892 Sarah quit her teaching job and started working in her father's law firm. Later that year she applied for a license to practice law in the First Judicial District Court of the Territory of Arizona in Tombstone. Her oral examination in open court was conducted by attorneys C.S. Clark, Allen English, and Judge W.H. Barnes. She passed unanimously. Sarah did not receive the same resistance that women attorneys in other parts of the country faced, such as Lavinia Goodell in Wisconsin, Myra Bradwell in Illinois, Clara Shortridge Foltz in California, and Belva Lockwood in Washington D.C. At the time of the 1890 census, there were only 208 women in the U.S. that were listed as attorneys.

After being admitted to the Bar, Sarah returned to New York City to attend New York University's School of Law. NYU was one of the first law schools in the nation to actively recruit women. Sarah graduated with an L.L.B. in 1894. She ranked fourth in her class of eighty-six graduates.

Upon graduation from NYU, she returned to her father's law firm in Tombstone. Her first case before the Arizona Supreme Court was in 1896 when she represented a mining company and won the case for her client.

Relocation to Tucson
In 1896 the Herring family left the declining Tombstone area and moved north to the thriving city of Tucson, Arizona. They were helped in their move by Thomas Sorin, who was to become Sarah's husband.

Sarah married Thomas Sorin on July 22, 1898, in her family's home in Tucson. Sarah was 37 and Thomas was 52. Thomas Sorin was a successful miner who, like many others, had left his mining operations in Tombstone to focus on other areas in Arizona. To many he was better known as the co-founder of the Tombstone Epitaph along with John Clum. Thomas Sorin, who was renowned for his mining expertise, represented the Arizona Territory mining industry at the Columbian Exposition in Chicago in 1893.

The Sorins spent the weekends at their ranch in Cochise County. During the week Sarah would travel to Tucson and practice law with her father, while Thomas would travel to various mining operations in the territory.

The law firm of Herring & Sorin focused on more than just representing mining companies. Herring worked with future son-in-law attorney Selim M. Franklin in founding the University of Arizona. Herring served a term as the University's Chancellor. Herring Hall was named for him. Colonel Herring was active in Arizona's statehood in 1912 and assisted in writing the state's first constitution.

Sarah's work brought her in front of the U.S. Supreme Court on four occasions. Her father was alive to witness the first two appearances, but died in 1912, before witnessing her greatest legal achievement in 1913.

U.S. Supreme Court cases
On April 16, 1906, Colonel Herring applied for his daughter's admission to the United States Supreme Court. Sarah became the 24th woman ever to be admitted. Belva Lockwood, the first woman ever admitted to the U.S. Supreme Court, attended Sarah's ceremony in Washington, D.C.

Sarah first appeared before the U.S. Supreme Court in October 1906 in the case of Taylor vs. Burns,. Herring made the final arguments. Herring & Sorin won the case for their client, Thomas Burns. The opinion was delivered by Justice Brewer.

Her next appearance involved mining tax issues. In an opinion delivered by Justice Oliver Wendell Holmes, they lost their argument. The case did lead to mining companies pushing for statutory revisions to tax laws, which led to the enactment of the Bullion Law, which Herring & Sorin drafted.

Sarah's third appearance before the nation's highest court occurred after her father's death. Sorin was helping her attorney brother-in-law Selim M. Franklin on a title case that was argued before the court.

Her fourth case was her landmark case, Work v. United Globe Mines, where she became the first woman to argue a case, unassisted and unaccompanied by a male attorney, on November 6, 1913. This event secured Sarah's place in national legal history. The written brief presented to the court was solely in Sarah's name, and she gave the final arguments by herself.  Her accomplishment was noted in many newspapers, including the New York Times. The Women's Lawyers' Journal stated that Sarah's argument was "one of the most brilliant ever presented to that court by a woman".

On January 5, 1914, Chief Justice White rendered the Court's decision  in favor of Sarah and her client, United Globe Mines.

Last days and recognition
After her father's death in 1912, Sarah moved her practice to Globe, Arizona, closer to the Sorin Ranch. Sarah was the corporate counsel for both the Old Dominion Copper Company and the United Globe Mines, which was part of the Phelps Dodge mining empire.

Not long after her triumph in the U.S. Supreme Court in January 1914, Sarah had to travel to Tombstone to deal with her father's estate. Shortly after she fell ill and died of pneumonia on April 30, 1914, in Globe, with her husband at her side. A ceremony was held in Tucson at her sister's home. Her obituary was carried on the front page of several newspapers and a special resolution was prepared by the Arizona State Bar Association. Both Sarah and Thomas Sorin are buried at Evergreen Cemetery in Tucson.

In 1985 Sarah Herring Sorin was admitted into the Arizona Women's Hall of Fame.

In 1999, the Arizona Women Lawyers Association created an annual Sarah Sorin Award.

The state that produced the first woman to present a case unassisted to the United States Supreme Court also later produced the first woman Justice of the Supreme Court, Justice Sandra Day O'Connor, and the first woman Chief Justice of a state supreme court, Lorna Lockwood.

See also

 Women in the United States judiciary
 Sandra Day O'Connor
 Belva Lockwood – pioneer woman attorney in Washington DC
 Clara Shortridge Foltz – pioneer woman attorney in California

Notes and references
 New York Times, Nov 6, 1913, "High Court Hears Woman"
 Arizona Historical Society Library, Tucson, Arizona
 University of Arizona Special Collections Library, Record Book I
 Arizona Women's Hall of Fame Pamphlet 1984
 "Women Lawyers in the United States," Lelia J. Robinson, The Green Bag, Vol. II, 1890
 "Western Women Defenders," 2000, Barbara Allen Babcock
 Tombstone's Early Years, John Myers Myers (1880–1881)
 Laws, Courts, and Lawyers Through the Years in Arizona, James M. Murphey (p. 156)
 A Historical and Biographical Record of the Territory of Arizona, George Roskrug (1896), p 309
 1884 Arizona Business Directory and Gazetteer
 "Sarah Herring Sorin: Arizona's First Woman Lawyer," Jacquelyn Gayle Kasper, Western Legal History (1999)
 Memoirs of an Arizona Judge, Richard E. Sloan (1932)
 A History of Phelps Dodge 1834–1950, Robert Glass Cleland (1952)
 Arizona Daily Star, May 1, 1914, Nov 22, 1892 and others
 Arizona Weekly Star, Jan 21, 1893 and others
 Tombstone Daily Prospector, January 15, 1893, November 1891, and other issues
 Tombstone Epitath, November 1892, January 1893, and other issues
 "The Beginnings of the Tombstone School 1879–1893", Matia McClelland Burk, Arizona and the West, Vol. 11, no. 3
 Tucson Daily Star, July 22, 1898 and other dates
 The Old Dominion Mine, Clara Woody
 Work v. United Globe Mines (1913), Transcript of Record
 Arizona Record, May 1914

References

External links
 Arizona Women's Hall of Fame: Sarah Herring Sorin
 Stanford Law – Women's Legal History: Sarah Herring Sorin PDF
 FindLaw Taylor v. Burns, Sarah Herring Sorin
 Tucson Citizen: Arizona's First Female Attorney
 Tucson's Territorial Pioneers
 Jacquelyn Kasper: Sarah Herring Sorin biography
 Supreme Court Historical Society
 

1861 births
1914 deaths
Arizona lawyers
History of women in the United States
19th-century American lawyers
20th-century American lawyers
Lawyers from New York City
New York University alumni
20th-century American women lawyers
19th-century American women lawyers